Emmanuel Martin (1827, Paris – 1897, Creil) was a French entomologist  specialising in Lepidoptera.

References
Charles Oberthür, 1904 Etudes de lépidoptérologie comparée Impr. Oberthür in Rennes .

French lepidopterists
1827 births
1897 deaths